Lady of the Lake was an Aberdeen-built brig that sank off the coast of Newfoundland in May 1833, with the loss of up to 265 passengers and crew. Only fifteen passengers and crew survived

Sinking
The vessel had departed from Belfast on 8 April 1833, bound for Quebec. One of the lifeboats capsized shortly after lowering, with the loss of an estimated 80 individuals. Lady of the Lake continued to sink with about 30 passengers clinging to the maintop mast. The survivors spent 75 hours in an open boat before being rescued by the ship Amazon.

Sources differ as to the final death toll, with estimates ranging from 170 to 265.

Voyages from 1829–1833

References

External links 
The Lady of the Lake at wrecksite.eu

1820s ships
Brigs
Sailing ships of Scotland
Shipwrecks of the Newfoundland and Labrador coast
Maritime incidents in May 1833
Ships built in Aberdeen
1820s in Scotland